Rough lemon (Citrus × jambhiri Lush.) is the fruit and the tree of a citrus hybrid. Like the rangpur, it is a cross between mandarin orange and citron.

Rough lemon is a cold-hardy citrus and can grow into a large tree.

The rough lemon is ninety per-cent rind, making it borderline inedible. As a result, the rough lemon is mainly used for citrus rootstock. There are several cultivars of rough lemon that can serve as a citrus rootstock, including 'Florida', 'Schaub', and 'Vangassay' rough lemon. The process for using the rough lemon as a citrus rootstock would start with mashing up the rough lemons. The mashed up rough lemons would then be put in a furrow, which is a long trench. This yellow mash would produce seedlings, which would end up growing into orange or grapefruit trees through shield budding, also known as T budding.

References

External links
 The Gardener
 FruitiPedia
 National Tropical Botanical Garden
 MirriamWebster

Citrus